Ismailia is a genus of foraminifera with an agglutinated, planispirally coiled, semi-involute shell, known from the Egyptian Sinai, that lived during the early part of the Late Cretaceous (Cenomanian).  Agglutinated shells (or tests) are composed of selected foreign material cemented together.

Ismailia, named by El-Dakkak, 1974, is assigned to the family Charenitidae and to the superfamily Biokovinacea, which are now included in the Loftusiida, an order established by Kaminski & Mikhalevich (2004).  Prior to, both the Loftusiacea and Biokovinacea, along with other superfamilies, were included in the Textulariida.

References 

 Alfred R. Loeblich Jr and Helen Tappan, 1988 (e-book)Forminiferal Genera and Their Classification
 Michael A. Kaminski, 2004. The Year 2000 Classification of the Agglutinated Foraminifera, in Bubík, M. & Kaminski, M.A. (eds), 2004. Proceedings of the Sixth International Workshop on Agglutinated Foraminifera. Grzybowski Foundation Special Publication, 8, 237-255.

Foraminifera genera